Burgessochaeta is an extinct genus of polychaete annelids from the Middle Cambrian.  Its fossils have been found in the Burgess Shale in British Columbia, Canada. A total of 189 specimens of Burgessochaeta are known from the Greater Phyllopod bed, where they comprise 0.36% of the community. Specimens have also been found at Marble Canyon. The genus was described by Conway Morris (1979) and re-examined by Eibye-Jacobsen (2004).

Physical characteristics 
Burgessochaeta had two long tentacles on its head. The rest of the body had between 16 and 30 segments (possibly indicating multiple species). Each segment had two groups of long chaetae on it, which Burgessochaeta presumably used to swim. Burgessochaeta is not thought to have had eyes. The body grew slightly wider towards the posterior end of the animal.

Ecology 
Burgessochaeta is thought to have been a decomposer or scavenger on organic material. It probably swam, as its bristles were much too long to be useful  for moving itself in a burrow. Specimens have been found from both continental slope and deep-water environments, indicating that this was a widespread animal.

General sources 
 The Crucible of Creation: The Burgess Shale and the Rise of Animals by Simon Conway-Morris

References

External links
 
 Burgessochaeta in the Paleobiology Database

Burgess Shale fossils
Burgess Shale animals
Cambrian animals of North America
Cambrian genus extinctions
Fossil taxa described in 1979
Polychaete genera
Prehistoric annelid genera